The voiceless retroflex plosive or stop is a type of consonantal sound, used in some spoken languages. This consonant is found as a phoneme mostly (though not exclusively) in two areas: South Asia and Australia.

Transcription
Like all the retroflex consonants, the IPA symbol is formed by adding a rightward-pointing hook extending from the bottom of "t" (the letter used for the equivalent alveolar consonant).

Features

Features of the voiceless retroflex stop:

Occurrence

See also
 Index of phonetics articles

Notes

References

 
 
.

External links

Phonology of English, including dialectical variations

Retroflex consonants
Voiceless stops
Pulmonic consonants
Voiceless oral consonants